The following is a discography of production by hip hop recording artist and record producer SAP.

Singles produced

2008

Meek Mill - Flamers 
 05. "In My Bag"

2011

Mac Miller - Best Day Ever
 03. "Donald Trump"
 07. "Wake Up"

2012

Don Trip - Guerrilla 
 04. "Trap'd In The Trap"

Mac Miller - Macadelic 
 04. "Thoughts from a Balcony"

The Game - California Republic
 05. "Mean Muggin'" (featuring 2 Chainz and French Montana)

Meek Mill - Dreamchasers 2
 18. "Real"

Don Trip - Help Is On the Way
 14. "Watch Me"

The Game - Sunday Service
 01. "Celebration (Remix)" (featuring Bone Thugs-n-Harmony) [produced with Cool & Dre]
 02. "Holy Water"
 04. "Black Jesus"

Chris Webby - Bars On Me
 07. "Dark Side" (featuring Emilio Rajas)

Freeway - Freedom of Speech
 11. "Ghetto Love" (featuring Free)

The Game - Jesus Piece
 08. "Name Me King" (featuring Pusha T)
 13. "Celebration" (featuring Chris Brown, Tyga, Wiz Khalifa, and Lil Wayne) [produced with Cool & Dre]
 17. "Holy Water"

2013

Tyga - Hotel California
 04. "Diss Song" (produced with Cool & Dre and Jess Jackson)
 13. "Enemies"

Lil Dicky - So Hard 
 08. "Attached at the Hip"
 14. "Too High"

XXL - XXL 2013's Freshmen Class: The Mixtape
 04. "She Like" (performed by ScHoolboy Q)

Mac Miller - Watching Movies with the Sound Off
 11. "Watching Movies" (produced with Larry Fisherman)

Freddie Gibbs - Evil Seeds Grow Naturally
 09. "One Eighty Seven" (featuring Problem)

Fat Joe - The Darkside III
 02. "Madison Squares" (produced with Cool & Dre)

Juicy J - Stay Trippy
 12. "Talkin' Bout" (featuring Chris Brown and Wiz Khalifa) [produced with ID Labs and Ritz Reynolds]

The Game - OKE: Operation Kill Everything
 04. "In the City" (featuring Fred the Godson and Sam Hook)
 05. "F.I.V.E." (featuring Chris Brown and Lil Wayne) [produced with Cool & Dre]
 13. "Compton" (featuring Stat Quo)
 15. "Super Throwed" (featuring Juicy J)

Snow Tha Product - Good Nights & Bad Mornings 2: The Hangover
 20. "Fuck the Rent"

Chevy Woods - Gang Land 2
 06. "Things Change"

Chris Webby - Homegrown
 06. "Only Way To Go"

2014

Wiz Khalifa - 28 Grams
 19. "The Last"

Tyga - 
 "Real Deal"

Phat J - Phat Wraps
 04. "Roll It Up" (featuring Joe Killit Fonix FEEN)

Spitta Andretti - More Saturday Night Car Tunes
 04. "Money Shot" (featuring Mac Miller)

Audio Push - 
 "Fwd Back" (featuring Riff Raff and King Chip)

The Game - Blood Moon: Year of the Wolf 
 18. "I Just Wanna Be" (featuring Stat Quo, SAP, and King Marie)

Chris Webby - Chemically Imbalanced
 02. "So Eazy"

Tyga - 
 "Make It Work"

Domo Genesis - Under the Influence 2 
 06. "Go Outside" (featuring Iamsu!)
 13. "STRICTLY4MYNIGGAZ"

Nipsey Hussle - Mailbox Money 
 04. "That's How I Knew" (produced with Kitchen J)

2015

Meek Mill - 
 "B Boy" (featuring Big Sean and A$AP Ferg)

Hodgy Beats - 
 "Layback"

Casey Veggies - 
 "Anybody"

Tyga - The Gold Album: 18th Dynasty 
 03. "Shaka Zulu" (produced with Jess Jackson)
 06. "Down for a Min" (produced with Jess Jackson and Mike Dean)

The Alumni - 
 "Forbes" (featuring Kid Ink, Bricc Baby, Vee Tha Rula, and Shy Glizzy)

Tyga - Fuk Wat They Talkin Bout 
 03. "Master $uite" (produced with Soundz and Cool & Dre)
 12. "Don't C Me Comin'" (featuring A.E.) [produced with Metro Boomin]

Chris Webby - Jamo Neat 
 01. "Walt and Jesse" (featuring SAP)
 02. "Master of the Ceremony"
 03. "Whatchu Need" (featuring SAP and Stacey Michelle)
 04. "Feelin' Like"
 05. "Screws Loose" (featuring Stacey Michelle)
 06. "True Romance"
 07. "Say It Ain't So" (featuring SAP)
 08. "Jekyll and Hyde" (featuring Stacey Michelle)
 09. "Vibe 2 It" (featuring SAP)
 10. "That's Life"

Mac Miller - GO:OD AM 
 16. "Jump" (produced with Badboxes, DJ Dahi, and ID Labs)

2016

Wiz Khalifa - Khalifa
 04. "City View" (featuring Courtney Noelle)

Domo Genesis - Genesis
 07. "Coming Back" (featuring Mac Miller)

The Game - Block Wars Soundtrack
 04. "Alameda"
 09. "Bullet with Your Name on It"

Upcoming

References 

Production discographies
Discographies of American artists